

Events
New Orleans crime family leader Carlo Matranga retires from the organization appointing Sylvestro "Sam" Carolla in his place. 
Louis Buchalter is sent to prison for burglary. 
New York crime family founders Joseph Profaci and Vincent Mangano arrive in the United States from Palermo, Sicily. 
Louis Romano, an associate of Francesco "Frank 'The Enforcer' Nitti" Nitto, is indicted for murder, however is later found acquitted. On Nitti's behalf, Romano would later assume control of the Chicago Bartender and Beverage Dispenser's Union, Local 278.
May 11 – Timothy D. "Big Tim" Murphy, Cornelius Shea and six other labor leaders are indicted for murdering a Chicago policeman. The state withdraws the indictment in August for lack of evidence.
May 8 – Vincenzo Terranova is killed outside his home, most likely by Rocco Valenti. 
July 9 – Joseph Peter DiCarlo, co-founder and then-boss of the present day Buffalo crime family, dies of natural causes and is succeeded by longtime (1922–1974) boss Stefano Magaddino.
August 9 – Umberto Valenti, a leading member of the Morello crime family, attempts to assassinate Joe Masseria after killing his two bodyguards, and upon cornering Masseria in a Second Avenue millinery shop Masseria manages to escape. Two days later, during peace negotiations with Morrello and Messeria, Valenti is killed by Charles Luciano outside a Twelfth Street restaurant while trying to escape an apparent attempt on his life. During the shootout an eight-year-old girl and a street cleaner are wounded. 
December 5 – New York gangster Benjamin Levinsky is killed by William Lipshitz.

Deaths
Richard Croker, Tammany Hall politician and former member of the Fourth Avenue Tunnel Gang 
May 8 – Vincenzo Terranova, New York gangster and underboss of the Morello crime family
July 9 – Joseph Peter DiCarlo, co-founder of the present day  Buffalo crime family
August 11 – Rocco Valenti, New York gangster and member of the Morello crime family  
December 5 – Benjamin Levinsky, New York gangster and labor racketeer

References 

Organized crime
Years in organized crime